Xhelal is an Albanian masculine given name. People with the name Xhelal include:
Xhelal Bey Zogu (1881–1944), Albanian prince, lawyer, judge, and politician 
Xhelal Deliallisi (fl. 19th–century), Albanian politician 
Xhelal Koprencka (18??–19??), Albanian politician
Xhelal Miroçi (born 1983), Kosovar footballer and coach
Xhelal Pasha Zogolli (18??–18??), Albanian politician, grandfather of King Zog I

References

Albanian masculine given names